Mount Pierre is a massif (2,200 m) standing next north of Mount Goossens in the Queen Fabiola Mountains. Discovered on October 7, 1960, by the Belgian Antarctic Expedition, under Guido Derom, who named it for Michel Pierre, aircraft mechanic, member of the Belgian flight reconnoitering party in this area.

Mountains of Queen Maud Land
Prince Harald Coast